Gimnazija Banja Luka is a public gymnasium school in Banja Luka, Bosnia and Herzegovina. Situated in the centre of the city, it was founded as the Velika Real, or Grand Royal school on October 4, 1895 by the Austro-Hungarian government, making it the oldest high school in the Republika Srpska entity.

The school, which has approximately 1,100 students and more than 100 staff, offers national and international study programmes. Annual enrollment is about 300 students for the national programmes and 18-22 for the international.

Education
The school teaches the national Matura programme and, as of 2006, the International Baccalaureate (IB) Diploma. Like most high schools in Bosnia and Herzegovina, the Matura programme takes 4 years (ages 15–19). Students choose among 4 different fields of curriculum focus: general, linguistics and social sciences, informatics, and natural sciences.

Buildings
The gymnasium was housed entirely in the original Velika Real building until 1969, when a new building was constructed in Zmaj Jovina Street after a major earthquake.

References

External links
 http://www.gimnazijabanjaluka.org, official website
 http://www.gimbl.com/eng
 http://www.znanje.org,         students-ran web site
 http://www.enovine.net,        students-ran web site

Gymnasiums in Bosnia and Herzegovina
Buildings and structures in Republika Srpska
Educational institutions established in 1895
1895 establishments in Austria-Hungary
International Baccalaureate schools in Bosnia and Herzegovina